Blast Off at Woomera is a children's science fiction novel, the first in the Chris Godfrey of U.N.E.X.A. series by British author Hugh Walters. It was published in the UK by Faber in 1957, in the USA by Criterion Books in 1958 (under the title Blast Off at 0300), and in the Netherlands in 1960 by Prisma Juniores (under the title Ruimtevaarder nummer één -- Astronaut Number One).

The books are considered to be collectable, costing £50-£100 or more on book trading sites.

Plot summary

Strange objects have been sighted on the Moon near Mons Pico. Suspecting a communist plot, the British Government quickly formulates a plan to photograph the dome-like objects from above at a closer range. The rocket is not large enough to send a man. Chris Godfrey, a 17-year-old science whiz with an interest in rocketry, who is less than 5 feet tall, is selected to assist.

The launch site is Woomera Rocket Research Station in South Australia, but there may be a Soviet traitor among the ground crew.

The book predates the first actual usage of satellite imagery by two years, and human spaceflight by four years.

Reception
Floyd C. Gale of Galaxy Science Fiction rated the book five stars out of five for children, stating that it "includes plenty of action and international intrigue. Plausible and detailed, it is a juvenile Prelude to Space".

References

External links
 Blast Off at Woomera page
 LiberalEngland nostalgic reminiscences on Jonathan Calder's blog
 Archive.org on-line lending library (as Blast Off at 03:00)

1957 British novels
1957 children's books
1957 science fiction novels
Chris Godfrey of U.N.E.X.A. series
Debut science fiction novels
Faber and Faber books
Novels set on the Moon
Novels set in South Australia
1957 debut novels